Valicevic is a surname. Notable people with the surname include:

Chris Valicevic (born 1968), American ice hockey player
Rob Valicevic (born 1971), American ice hockey player

See also
Vulićević